Minkowski is a crater on the far side of the Moon, in the lower latitudes of the southern hemisphere. The lunar crater lies about one crater diameter to the north-northeast of crater Lemaître, a formation of similar dimension. To the northwest of Minkowski is the flooded crater Baldet, and to the southeast lies Fizeau.

The outer rim of Minkowski is heavily eroded, and forms little more than an irregular circular ridge in the surface. Numerous craters lie across the rim, the most prominent being two pairs along the eastern edge. The interior floor is relatively level, with a dark patch in the northeast quadrant that is characteristic of a lava-flooded surface. There is a small bowl-shaped crater located prominently at the midpoint. Minkowski S lies along the southwestern edge of the floor. A number of tiny craterlets mark the interior surface, particularly in the southwest quadrant.

Satellite craters 

By convention these features are identified on lunar maps by placing the letter on the side of the crater midpoint that is closest to Minkowski.

See also 
 12493 Minkowski, main-belt asteroid

References 

 
 
 
 
 
 
 
 
 
 
 
 

Impact craters on the Moon
Hermann Minkowski